Melanella acuformis is a species of sea snail, a marine gastropod mollusk in the family Eulimidae. This species, along with multiple other known species, belongs in the genus, Melanella.

References

External links
 To World Register of Marine Species

acuformis
Gastropods described in 1875